is a former Japanese football player.

Club career
Yabuta was born in Kawasaki on May 2, 1976. He joined Verdy Kawasaki from youth team in 1995. He debuted in 1997. He moved to new club Yokohama FC in Japan Football League. He played as regular player and he moved to Vissel Kobe in 2000. He played many games as offensive midfielder. In 2005, his opportunity to play decreased and the club was relegated to J2 League. From 2006, he played for Avispa Fukuoka (2006), Yokohama FC (2007) and FC Gifu (2008). He retired end of 2008 season.

National team career
In April 1995, Yabuta was selected Japan U-20 national team for 1995 World Youth Championship. He played 2 matches.

Club statistics

References

External links

1976 births
Living people
Association football people from Kanagawa Prefecture
Japanese footballers
Japan youth international footballers
J1 League players
J2 League players
Japan Football League players
Tokyo Verdy players
Yokohama FC players
Vissel Kobe players
Avispa Fukuoka players
FC Gifu players
Association football midfielders
Association football forwards
Guangzhou City F.C. non-playing staff